Vrh pri Trebelnem is a small dispersed settlement in the hills west of Trebelno in the Municipality of Mokronog-Trebelno in southeastern Slovenia. The area is part of the historical region of Lower Carniola. The municipality is now included in the Southeast Slovenia Statistical Region.

Name
The name of the settlement was changed from Vrh to Vrh pri Trebelnem in 1953.

References

External links
Vrh pri Trebelnem on Geopedia

Populated places in the Municipality of Mokronog-Trebelno